{{Infobox cultivar
| name = Lemon drop chilli, ají limón
| image = C_baccatum_lemon_drop_fruit.jpg
| genus = Capsicum| species = Capsicum baccatum| cultivar = 'Lemon Drop'
| module = 
}}

The Lemon Drop pepper, Ají Limón or Ají Limo, is a hot, citrus-like, lemon-flavored pepper which is a popular seasoning pepper in Peru, where it is known as qillu uchu.

Description

Plants of the lemon drop variety are typical representatives of the species Capsicum baccatum''. The plant grows upright and is highly branched. The leaves are dark green and relatively narrow, the petals are whitish - green and carry yellow - green spots on the base. Lemon drop is a high yielding chilli plant, in a year one plant can produce over 100 fruits. The time between fertilization of flowers and ripening of the fruit is about 80 days.

Varieties 
The lemon drop or ají limo has the following variants:
 Ají mochero: Characterized by its citrus scent and bright yellow color.
 Ají miscucho.
 Ají paringo.
 Ají bola.

References

External links

 Ají Limo (Qillu Uchu, Lemon Drop Chili, Lemon Drop Pepper, Ají Limon). Tasteatlas WORLD FOOD ATLAS.
 

Chili peppers
Capsicum cultivars